Scythris corsa is a moth of the family Scythrididae. It was described by Pietro Passerin d'Entrèves in 1986. It is found on Corsica.

The wingspan is 13–15 mm.

The larvae feed on Anthyllis hermanni.

References

corsa
Moths described in 1986
Moths of Europe